National Highway 315 (NH 315) is a  National Highway in India. It connects Makum and Lekhapani in Assam.

References

National highways in India